Epirrhoe sperryi, the small argent and sable, is a species of geometrid moth in the family Geometridae. It is found in North America.

The MONA or Hodges number for Epirrhoe sperryi is 7396.

References

Further reading

External links

 

Epirrhoe
Articles created by Qbugbot
Moths described in 1951